The Democratic Party (abbreviated DP) is a political party in Myanmar (Burma), founded in 1988. It was formally registered in May 2010, with its headquarters in Pazundaung Township, Yangon.

The party's chairman is U Thu Wai, a former political prisoner. The party's secretaries, Mya Than Than Nu and Cho Cho Kyaw Nyein, are the daughters of U Nu (former prime minister) and Kyaw Nyein (former deputy prime minister), all well-known Burmese political leaders in the Anti-Fascist People's Freedom League.

The party contested in the 2010 general election, winning 3 seats in the State and Regional Hluttaws. The party won only a single seat in the 2015 general election, out of the 52 seats it contested. U Aung Shwe, the party's candidate representing Chan Aye Thar San Township for the Mandalay Region Hluttaw, won a majority of the votes, because that the candidate representing the National League for Democracy was rejected before the election.

References 

Political parties established in 2010
Political parties in Myanmar
Burmese democracy movements
2010 establishments in Myanmar